

Number allocations
Kiribati numbers were changed from 5 to 8 digits in a phased process between 2013 and 2018.

Landlines (fixed)

Mobile and other services

Special services

See also 
 Telecommunications in Kiribati

References

Kiribati
Communications in Kiribati